Emilitinae is a subfamily  based on the genus Emilites, proposed by Leonova and Bogoslovskaya, 1990, for the most primitive members of the Adrianitidae, but no longer generally recognized as an independent taxon.  Emilites  and the other genera listed in the Emilitinae have been reassigned to the Adrianitinae where they were previously found.

These are part of an extinct group of  shelled cephalopods known as ammonoids, which are more closely related to squids, belemnites, octopuses, and cuttlefish than to the nautiloids from which they are derived.

References
 Emilitinae in  GONIAT online 12/03/10
 Paleodb Emilitidae 12/03/10
 The Paleobiology Database accessed on 10/01/07

Adrianitidae